QueerTV is a syndicated Australian television series produced by Panda Media, created and directed by Chris Reynolds and Pandora Box. In 2003, the show is now running into its tenth season in Australia. It appears on Television Sydney (Channel 31) and Aurora Community Channel on the Foxtel, Austar and Optus Digital Networks and is also sold around the world.

Pandora Box was a reporter for DV8TV on Channel 31 producing eight segments that ran for 5 minutes an episode. With the end of DV8 Chris and Pandora created QueerTV.

The QueerTV crew have filmed and reported on the Sydney Gay and Lesbian Mardi Gras for the past 4 years. 
The line up of presenters and reporters include Pandora Box, Jo Smith, Sexy Galexy, Goldie MacShift, Aaron Harkness, Ricki Renee, BovaGirl, and Matt Taylor.

See also
Out TV (disambiguation)

External links
Queertv Official Site
Queertv Official Episode Downloads on WasabiTV

Australian non-fiction television series
Australian LGBT-related television shows